Indonesia was participating in the 2019 Southeast Asian Games from 30 November to 11 December 2019. The Indonesian contingent consist of 837 athletes, competing in 56 sports.

Medal summary

Medal by sport

  Not Participated
  Not Ranked
  Not Awarded
 no medals were awarded because only 2 competitors.

Medal by date

Medalists

 Not awarded for this event category

References

2019
Southeast Asian Games
Nations at the 2019 Southeast Asian Games